Ernest Newton Sharpe (1866 – January 1949) was an eminent Anglican. Priest in the 20th century.

He was born into an ecclesiastical family  in 1866 and educated at Westminster and Clare College, Cambridge. Ordained in 1890, he began his career  with a curacy at Bath Abbey. Following this he was Vicar of Emanuel Church, West Hampstead   then Rector of Kersal. After this he was Rector of Holy Trinity, Marylebone, then Rural Dean of Paddington. A Prebendary then Canon of St Paul's Cathedral, he was Archdeacon of London from 1930 to 1947. He died on 20 January 1949.

Notes

1866 births
People educated at Westminster School, London
Alumni of Clare College, Cambridge
Archdeacons of London
1949 deaths